Raavan is a 2010 Indian Hindi-language epic action-adventure film written and directed by Mani Ratnam, who also co-produced the film. It stars Abhishek Bachchan,  Aishwarya Rai Bachchan and Vikram, while Govinda, Nikhil Dwivedi, Ravi Kishan and Priyamani feature in key supporting roles. It marks the Hindi film debuts of Vikram and Priyamani. The film follows the crux of the epic Ramayana, but with a modernized plot which reveals the perspective of Ravana. 

Raavan was announced in February 2008, whilst Abhishek and Aishwarya's collaboration in the second time after Guru (2007), creating more anticipation. Shooting began soon after, and took place in various locations with a record number of extras in areas including Chalakudy, Kerala and Ooty, Tamil Nadu amongst other regions throughout India. The film's music was composed by A. R. Rahman, with lyrics written by Gulzar, the cinematography was handled by V. Manikandan and Santhosh Sivan, and editing is done by A. Sreekar Prasad.

The film was simultaneously released in Tamil as Raavanan with Vikram, playing the antagonist and Aishwarya Rai reprising her role in Tamil as well. Both versions released simultaneously on 18 June 2010 worldwide. The film's premiere was held in London on 16 June 2010.

Plot 
A naxalite named Beera Munda and his gang are busy distracting the cops, where police vehicles are set ablaze and women seduce cops into a trap whereby Beera's henchmen attacks and brutally kill them. Whilst on a boating trip, Raagini Sharma is kidnapped by Beera, where her husband ASP Dev Pratap Sharma, is informed of the incident. It is revealed that Beera is a local hero in his village, who runs a parallel government in rural areas with his brothers – Mangal and Hariya. Though considered a naxalite by the local police, Beera is respected by the villagers. He actually kidnapped Raagini hoping to avenge the death of his sister Jamunia, where he brings her to a cliff to kill her. She refuses to die at his hands and jumps off the cliff into the water far below, hoping to kill herself, but to no avail. 

This causes Beera to hold off the murder, being unable to kill someone who has no fear of death. Dev and his team enter the forests with the aid of Sanjeevani Kumar, a local forest guard. Despite searching deep in the forests, Dev is unable to hunt down Veera. Meanwhile, Raagini (who is actually suffering from Stockholm Syndrome) learns that Dev had led an encounter against Veera during Jamunia's wedding, where his shot grazed Beera in the neck. Fighting for his life, Beera is unable to protect his sister and is led out of the fiasco by his gang. The police pressurised Jamunia into revealing Veera's hideout. When she refused, she was subjected to torture and was physically assaulted by the cops. Beera returned home to find Jamunia depressed and traumatised. The next day, Jamunia committed suicide by drowning in a nearby well. Unhappy with the ways of leading the war causing distress to his gang, Hariya offers a truce to Dev, who initially seems to agree. 

When Hariya arrives from his hideout, Dev shoots him to death revealing that he considers the destruction of Beera as more important than saving Raagini. Beera and Mangal are enraged and attack Dev's camp where they wipe out completely. A final confrontation ensues between Beera and Dev on a rickety bridge where Beera triumphs over Dev, but leaves him as Dev told that he is leaving him alive because of Raagini. Dev manages to extricate himself out and finds Raagini bound and tied up with Veera leaving her. While returning to their hometown, Dev accuses Raagini of infidelity and informs her that Beera actually told him. Furious, Raagini leaves Dev to meet Beera through Mangal, where she manages to meet him and asks him about the accusation. Beera denies the accusation, where the duo quickly realises that Dev lied, hoping Raagini would lead him to his hideout. Dev appears with a police team and confronts Beera. Raagini tries to save Beera, but he pushes her out of the line of fire, and is shot multiple times, where Beera falls to his death with a smile while Ragini is distraught.

Cast 
Abhishek Bacchan as Beera Munda (a character based on Ravana)
Aishwarya Rai Bachchan as Ragini Sharma / Mahua (a character based on Sita)
Vikram as Dev Pratap Sharma IPS, Additional Superintendent of Police 2  a character based on Sri Rama
Govinda as Sanjeevani Kumar (a character based on Lord Hanuman)
Nikhil Dwivedi as DSP Hemant Sinha (a character based on Lakshmana)
Ravi Kishan as Mangal, Beera's brother (a character based on Kumbhakarna)
Priyamani as Jamuni, Beera's sister (a character based on Shurpanakha)
Ajay Gehi as Hariya, Beera's younger brother (a character based on Vibhishana)
Sachin Khedekar (cameo)
Pankaj Tripathi as Gulabiya, a transgender woman in the village
Tejaswini Kolhapure as Dulari
Anshika Srivastav as Puniya
 Faisal Rashid as Rajeshwar Tiwari aka Guddu, Jamuni's lover (a character based on Vidyutjihva)
Chintu Mohaptra as Photographer
Alpa Joshi as Tiwari's wife
Mangal Kekre as Jamuni's mother (a character based on Kaikashi)
Manoj Mishra as Ranjit, Beera's spy (a character based on Shuka and Sarana)

Production

Development 
During the making of his 2007 biopic Guru starring Abhishek Bachchan and Aishwarya Rai Bachchan, Mani Ratnam had finalised a script for his next directorial venture titled Lajjo. Based on a short story by Ismat Chughtai, it was a musical period film set in the desert and was to star Aamir Khan and Kareena Kapoor in the lead. Though the film was slated to go on floors after the release of the former, there were reports of a fall-out between Ratnam and Khan due to creative differences. While cinematographer P. C. Sreeram denied the reports, the film's would-be lyricist Gulzar said there were actually problems with acquiring the copyright of the story, and composer A. R. Rahman even confirmed to having completed 80% of the film score. Yet, the project was put on the back burner for reasons unknown.

Following the critical and commercial success of Guru, Ratnam announced his next film in February 2008. A modern-day retelling of the mythological epic Ramayana, the film again features the real life couple in the lead. The film was initially planned to be made only in Hindi and the idea for the Tamil version came later. In January 2009, while the film was in the making, it was further decided to dub the Tamil version to Telugu making it a tri-lingual. While the film was yet to be titled, it was widely reported in the media that the Tamil version was titled Ashokavanam in reference to the place where Sita was held captive by Ravana. Subsequently, the film was titled Raavan in Hindi and Raavanan in Tamil. While the plot is inspired by Ramayana, the story is narrated from Ravana's perspective making him the protagonist. The film is centered on the 'Ashokavanam' episode where Ravana kidnaps Sita and keeps her in Asokavanam. Later Rama ventures to save his wife and bring her back.

Casting 
Bachchan and Vikram were roped in for the contrasting leads. Rai plays the female lead in both versions of the film.

Manikandan was hired as the film's cinematographer; however, he walked out in May 2009 and was replaced by Santosh Sivan. The editing was done by Sreekar Prasad. Rai's costumes were exclusively designed by fashion designer Sabyasachi Mukherjee. Choreography was by Ganesh Acharya, Brinda, Shobana, and Astad Deboo. Peter Hein and Shyam Koushal choreographed the action sequences and Samir Chanda took care of production design.

Filming 
Raavan was shot in numerous locations around India including the forests of Karnataka (Tumkur), Kerala (Athirappilly Falls), Ooty, Dharmapuri (Hogenakkal Falls), Jhansi, Kolkata, Mahabaleshwar and in the Malshej Ghats in Maharashtra.

Principal photography commenced in October 2008, in the forests near Kochi, Kerala. A few scenes were filmed at Athirappilly Falls, Ratnam's favourite location. Incidentally, he has shot for the songs 'Jiya Jale' in Dil Se.. and 'Barso Re' in Guru at the same location. Forest officials banned the shooting at Malayattoor, an eco-tourism centre, for violating rules and constructing temporary huts, delaying the shoot for 11 days until the issues were resolved on 22 October 2008, while laying down reworked rules. The second leg of the shooting at Ooty that began in December 2008 was also delayed as local cab drivers protested the use of film federation (FEFSI) vehicles which affected their business, forcing a dejected Ratnam to call off the shoot temporarily and move on to Hogenakkal Falls. In February 2009, the crew advanced to Kolkata where the song 'Kalvare' was shot by the banks of Hooghly at Agarpara. Later, as the shooting resumed and progressed at Ooty, Ratnam fell ill in April 2009 and was hospitalised at Apollo Hospitals, causing a further delay of 47 days until filming resumed in June 2009 following his recovery. As the numerous delays affected his other projects, DOP Manikandan walked out in May and was replaced by Santosh Sivan. By July, the crew moved back to Kerala, to reshoot a few scenes at Chalakudy as Ratnam was reportedly unsatisfied after seeing the rushes. This time around, heavy rains played spoilsport leading to another delay in filming. Moreover, when an elephant brought for the shoot ran amok killing the mahout, the Animal Welfare Board served a show cause notice to the production company (Madras Talkies) for not taking permission to use elephants.

The film began its last schedule in August 2009 at the Malshej Ghats in Maharashtra where the climax sequence was shot, the final encounter taking place on a wooden bridge. Production designer Samir Chanda built three identical bridges to facilitate the scene to be captured from different angles. Though initially planned to be built either in Sri Lanka, Australia or South Africa, the bridge was constructed in Mumbai to reduce costs. While bad weather and heavy rains disrupted shoot for a few days, the forest department filed cases against some crew members for trespassing. The film went into post-production by the end of 2009.

Numerous action sequences were performed by the actors. The actors suffered from real cuts and bruises so they didn't need make up. The stunts were directed by Mani Ratnam and choreographed by Peter Hein, who received a Filmfare action award for the Hindi versions of Ghajini and Anniyan. For his introduction scene, the protagonist has to jump from a 90-foot high cliff near the Hogenakkal Falls into the river below. This risky dive was performed by a body double, Balram, a Bangalore based former national diving champion. Kalarippayattu, a martial art form origaniting from Kerala, was also featured in the film. Sunil Kumar, a Kalari gym trainer from Kozhikode, trained the actors. Dancer Astad Deboo choreographed a passionate chase scene and a tandav dance between Abhishek and Aishwarya for the film.

Music 

The soundtrack for the film was composed by A. R. Rahman with lyrics penned by Gulzar. It features six songs and an additional song that was performed by Rahman at the audio launch. It was released on 7 May 2010 by T-Series.

The additional track performed by Rahman, titled "Jaare Ud Jaare", was not included in the CD. The song was cited to be an "instant composition": "The night before the launch, Rahman closeted himself in his Mumbai studio and worked through the night to compose the song." This song is believed to be included in the later stages. The soundtrack also features three additional songs that were featured in the movie.

Release 
Raavan, along with its simultaneously made Tamil version Raavanan, was released on 18 June 2010.

Reception

Critical response 

Among Indian film critics, Raavan received mixed reviews and responses. Rajeev Masand of IBN gave the film 1.5/5 and said, "Despite some eye-watering camerawork and a stunning action piece in the film's climax, the film -- especially its first half -- is a carelessly edited mess of long scenes that make little sense when strung together." Noyon Jyoti Parasara of AOL rated it 2.5/5 and stated, "Raavan is more a choreographed musical-cum-psychological drama but without proper character backing. What makes the movie worth watching is the peaks in the second half, of course apart from the imagery." Taran Adarsh of Bollywood Hungama rated it 1.5/5 and said, "On the whole, Raavan is a king-sized disappointment, in terms of content." Sukanya Venkatraghavan of Filmfare rated the film 3/5 and said, "Raavan has its moments but it lacks depth. The first half is fairly riveting but the second half slowly slips into a coma." Nikhat Kazmi of The Times of India rated it favourably at 3.5/5, saying, "There are enough punches in the second half to keep the momentum going, but by and large, the film scores mostly on art and aesthete." Raja Sen of Rediff rated it 2/5 and said, "Raavan truly and tragically fails us is in taking one of our greatest epics, and making it unforgivably boring." Parimal Rohit of Buzzine Bollywood said, "Raavan is ultimately a clever film, as it pushed the envelope on how one goes about defining who is good and who is evil."

, Raavan holds a 46% approval rating among the audience. Cath Clarke of The Guardian gave the film a rating of 2/5 and found it sexist, while New York Post critic Lou Lumenick wrote, "If you're not a fan of Bollywood movies – which have long resisted crossover attempts in this country despite the success of hybrids such as Slumdog Millionaire — Mani Ratnam's action melodrama Raavan probably isn't going to make a convert out of you." However, Frank Lovece of Film Journal International found it a "cracklingly stylish, suspenseful psychological drama" with "a visual sense that evokes David Fincher at his darkest", and admired the dance numbers, "one taking place somewhat naturalistically at a wedding, the other essentially a stunning war dance."

The New York Times and the Los Angeles Times likewise gave it positive reviews: Rachel Saltz of the former made it a Times "Critic's Pick" and lauded Ratnam as "a talented visual storyteller who directs action crisply and fills the screen with striking images" including "an eye-popping climactic battle", while Kevin Thomas of the latter said the film "is replete with dizzying camerawork, myriad complications, violent mayhem, broad humor, [the] usual musical interludes, a cliffhanging climactic confrontation and a finish that strikes a note of poignancy."

Box office 
Raavan opened "below expectations" at the Indian box office, with the Hindi version earning Rs 60.1 million on its opening day. In North America, Raavan opened in 120 theaters and ranked No. 15 on the domestic weekend box office chart with $760. Box Office India declared the film a Flop.

Unlike its Hindi counterpart, which tanked at the box office, the Tamil version tasted success in the South. During its opening weekend on 15 screens in Chennai, it was the number one film and netted , an opening weekend record then. Though the film opened to packed houses, it slumped a little due to mixed reviews but later picked up following a local holiday. The film collected $8 million at the box office in the first month of release including $400,000 from Kerala. It went on to make over  600 million at the worldwide box office and remained one of the top Tamil grossers of the year. Uk opening weekend. UK boxoffice second week. New York boxoffice.

Accolades 
 6th Apsara Film & Television Producers Guild Awards
Won
 Apsara Award for Best Cinematography – V. Manikandan (shared with Guzaarish)
 Apsara Award for Best Re-recording – Tapan Nayak
 Apsara Award for Best Visual Credits – Srinivas Karthik Kotamraju
 Apsara Award for Best cinematography – Santosh Sivan

Nominated
 Apsara Award for Best Performance in a Supporting Role (Female) – Priya Mani

2011 Zee Cine Awards
Nominated
Best Actor in a Negative Role – Abhishek Bachchan

3rd Mirchi Music Awards
Nominated
 Upcoming Male Vocalist of The Year – Mustafa Kutoane and Kirti Sagathia – "Beera"
 Song representing Sufi tradition – "Ranjha Ranjha"
 Best Programmer & Arranger of the Year – A. R. Rahman – "Ranjha Ranjha"
 Best Background Score of the Year – A. R. Rahman

References

External links 
 Official trailers
 
 
 
 
 

Indian epic films
Indian action adventure films
Indian romantic action films
Films set in India
2010s Hindi-language films
Indian multilingual films
Films scored by A. R. Rahman
Films directed by Mani Ratnam
Films set in forests
Films shot in Chalakudy
2010 multilingual films
2010 films
2010s action adventure films
Reliance Entertainment films
Sony Pictures films
Columbia Pictures films
Sony Pictures Networks India films
Films shot in Thrissur